Hobart City High School is a government co-educational high school in New Town, Hobart. Hobart City High School was formed in 2022 when Oglivie High School and New Town High School merged. The merged schools are now co-educational and were the last of Tasmania's single-sex public schools. Hobart City High caters for approximately 1200 students from Years 7 to 12. It is administered by the Tasmanian Department of Education.

Hobart City High School has two main campuses called Oglivie and New Town to recognize the previous schools. As of 2022, the school's lead principal is Deb Day.

History

New Town Campus 
New Town was established in 1919 as Hobart Junior Technical College as a boys' school. It rebranded at Hobart Technical High School in 1950 and settled on New Town High School in 1961.

Oglivie High School 
Oglivie was established in 1937 as New Town Commercial High School as a selective co-educational school, designed for studying commerce. Three years later, it was renamed A.G. Ogilvie High School in honour of Albert Ogilvie, the Premier of Tasmania, who died in 1939. 

In 1963, Oglivie became Tasmania's first all-girls' public high school.

In 2010, Oglivie underwent renovations to create a student centre which received the Australian Institute of Architects’ 2011 Tasmanian Architecture Awards and the Alan C. Walker Award for Public Architecture 2011.

Hobart City High School 
The new model for Oglivie and New Town High Schools was announced in November 2020.

The draft master plan for Hobart City High School was released in March 2022 and received over $21 million in government support.

Hobart City High School is part of a partnership with Elizabeth College, called the Hobart City Partner Schools. This collaboration is part of the school's transition to co-education and may culminate in Elizabeth College joining Hobart City High to form one school with three campuses.

Curriculum
Students study five core subjects, aligning with the Australian Curriculum. These include: English, Health and Physical Education, Humanities and Social Sciences (years 7 and 8), History (years 9 and 10), Mathematics and Science. From year 8, students can also choose optional subjects, like arts, technologies and work studies. Hobart City High also offer a gifted and highly-able education program.

Hobart City High School works with Big Picture Learning Australia. Big Picture is a not-for-profit company which allows students to create a personalised learning program involving internships, individual projects and mentors.

See also
 List of schools in Tasmania
 Education in Tasmania

References

External links
Hobart City High School's website

Public high schools in Hobart
Rock Eisteddfod Challenge participants
Educational institutions established in 1937
1937 establishments in Australia
Educational institutions established in 1919
1919 establishments in Australia